Angélique Arnaud (1797–1884) was a French novelist and feminist writer.

Arnaud travelled to Paris from the provinces, and involved herself in feminist circles around Henri de Saint-Simon. As well as her novels, she wrote articles and polemical pamphlets. She studied with François Delsarte, and wrote a critical study of him.

Biography

In 1833, she began to write articles in newspapers on the theme of liberal and republican causes. The salary she earned allowed her to hire a tutor for her children and thus to have time to write. She defended feminism, socialism and saint-simonianism.

Her progressive novels were very popular with the female public. George Sand described her writing as the "thousand delightful sentiments, the thousand graceful lines of poetry in her analyses and descriptions."

She wrote for publications such as, Le Monde maçonnique and was active in the Society for the Advancement of Women.

Maria Deraismes wrote at Arnauds death that she was "the apostle of all the major demands...There was no humanitarian and generous movement in this century in which Arnaud was not involved".

Selected works
La Comtesse de Sergy, 1838
Clémence, 1841
Une tendre dévote, 1874
La Cousine Adèle, 1879
François Delsarte; Ses découvertes en esthétique, sa science, sa méthode,

References

External links
 
  
 

1797 births
1884 deaths
French women novelists
19th-century French novelists
French feminists
19th-century French women writers
19th-century women writers
French socialist feminists